Linguistic discrimination (also called glottophobia, linguicism and languagism) is unfair treatment of people which is based on their use of language and the characteristics of their speech, including their first language, their accent, the perceived size of their vocabulary (whether or not the speaker uses complex and varied words), their modality, and their syntax. For example, an Occitan speaker in France will probably be treated differently from a French speaker. Based on a difference in use of language, a person may automatically form judgments about another person's wealth, education, social status, character or other traits, which may lead to discrimination.

In the mid-1980s, linguist Tove Skutnabb-Kangas captured the idea of language-based discrimination as linguicism, which was defined as "ideologies and structures which are used to legitimize, effectuate, and reproduce unequal divisions of power and resources (both material and non-material) between groups which are defined on the basis of language". Although different names have been given to this form of discrimination, they all hold the same definition. It is also important to note that linguistic discrimination is culturally and socially determined due to preference for one use of language over others.

Scholars have analyzed the role of linguistic imperialism in linguicism, with some asserting that speakers of dominant languages gravitate towards discrimination against speakers of other, less dominant languages, while disadvantaging themselves linguistically by remaining monolingual. According to scholar Carolyn McKinley, this phenomenon is most present in Africa, where the majority of the population speaks European languages introduced during the colonial era; African states are also noted as instituting European languages as the main medium of instruction, instead of indigenous languages. UNESCO reports have noted that this has historically benefitted only the African upper class, conversely disadvantaging the majority of Africa's population who hold varying level of fluency in the European languages spoken across the continent. Scholars have also noted impact of the linguistic dominance of English on academic discipline; scholar Anna Wierzbicka has described disciplines such as social science and humanities being "locked in a conceptual framework grounded in English" which prevents academia as a whole from reaching a "more universal, culture-independent perspective".

Linguistic prejudice

Speakers with certain accents may experience prejudice. For example, some accents hold more prestige than others depending on the cultural context. However, with so many dialects, it can be difficult to determine which is the most preferable. The best answer linguists can give, such as the authors of Do You Speak American?, is that it depends on the location and the speaker. Research has determined however that some sounds in languages may be determined to sound less pleasant naturally. Also, certain accents tend to carry more prestige in some societies over other accents. For example, in the United States speaking General American (a variety associated with the privileged white middle class) is widely preferred in many contexts such as television journalism. Also, in the United Kingdom, the Received Pronunciation is associated with being of higher class and thus more likable. In addition to prestige, research has shown that certain accents may also be associated with less intelligence, and having poorer social skills. An example can be seen in the difference between Southerners and Northerners in the United States, where people from the North are typically perceived as being less likable in character, and Southerners are perceived as being less intelligent. As sociolinguist, Lippi-Green, argues, "It has been widely observed that when histories are written, they focus on the dominant class... Generally studies of the development of language over time are very narrowly focused on the smallest portion of speakers: those with power and resources to control the distribution of information."

Language and social group saliency

It is natural for human beings to want to identify with others. One way we do this is by categorizing individuals into specific social groups. While some groups may be readily noticeable (such as those defined by ethnicity or gender), other groups are less salient. Linguist Carmen Fought explains how an individual's use of language may allow another person to categorize them into a specific social group that may otherwise be less apparent. For example, in the United States it is common to perceive Southerners as less intelligent. Belonging to a social group such as the South may be less salient than membership to other groups that are defined by ethnicity or gender. Language provides a bridge for prejudice to occur for these less salient social groups.

Linguistic discrimination and colonization

History of linguistic imperialism

Linguistic discrimination and culture 

Several postcolonial literary theorists have drawn a link between linguistic discrimination and the oppression of indigenous cultures. Prominent Kenyan author Ngugi wa Thiong'o, for example, argues in his book Decolonizing the Mind that language is both a medium of communication, as well as a carrier of culture. As a result, linguistic discrimination resulting from colonization has facilitated the erasure of pre-colonial histories and identities. For example, African slaves were taught English and forbidden to use their indigenous languages. This severed the slaves' linguistic and thus cultural connection to Africa.

Colonial languages and class 

In contrast to settler colonies, in exploitation colonies, education in colonial tongues was only accessible to a small indigenous elite. Both the British Macaulay Doctrine, as well as French and Portuguese systems of assimilation, for example, sought to create an "elite class of colonial auxiliaries" who could serve as intermediaries between the colonial government and local populace. As a result, fluency in colonial languages became a signifier of class in colonized lands.

In postcolonial states, linguistic discrimination continues to reinforce notions of class. In Haiti, for example, working-class Haitians predominantly speak Haitian Creole, while members of the local bourgeoise are able to speak both French and Creole. Members of this local elite frequently conduct business and politics in French, thereby excluding many of the working-class from such activities. In addition, D. L. Sheath, an advocate for the use of indigenous languages in India, also writes that the Indian elite associates nationalism with a unitary identity, and in this context, "uses English as a means of exclusion and an instrument of cultural hegemony”.

Linguistic discrimination in education 

Class disparities in postcolonial nations are often reproduced through education. In countries such as Haiti, schools attended by the bourgeoisie are usually of higher quality and use colonial languages as their means of instruction. On the other hand, schools attended by the rest of the population are often taught in Haitian Creole. Scholars such as Hebblethwaite argue that Creole-based education will improve learning, literacy and socioeconomic mobility in a country where 95% of the population are monolingual in Creole. However, resultant disparities in colonial language fluency and educational quality can impede social mobility.

On the other hand, areas such as French Guiana have chosen to teach colonial languages in all schools, often to the exclusion of local indigenous languages. As colonial languages were viewed by many as the "civilized" tongues, being "educated" often meant being able to speak and write in these colonial tongues. Indigenous language education was often seen as an impediment to achieving fluency in these colonial languages, and thus deliberately suppressed.

Certain Commonwealth nations such as Uganda and Kenya have historically had a policy of teaching in indigenous languages and only introducing English in the upper grades. This policy was a legacy of the "dual mandate" as conceived by Lord Lugard, a British colonial administrator in Nigeria. However, by the post-war period, English was increasingly viewed as necessary skill for accessing professional employment and better economic opportunities. As a result, there was increasing support amongst the populace for English-based education, which Kenya's Ministry of Education adopted post-independence, and Uganda following their civil war. Later on, members of the Ominde Commission in Kenya expressed the need for Kiswahili in promoting a national and pan-African identity. Kenya therefore began to offer Kiswahili as a compulsory, non-examinable subject in primary school, but it remained secondary to English as a medium of instruction.

While the mastery of colonial languages may provide better economic opportunities, the Convention against Discrimination in Education and the UN Convention on the Rights of the Child also states that minority children have the right to "use [their] own [languages]". The suppression of indigenous languages within the education system appears to contravene this treaty. In addition, children who speak indigenous languages can also be disadvantaged when educated in foreign languages, and often have high illiteracy rates. For example, when the French arrived to "civilize" Algeria, which included imposing French on local Algerians, the literacy rate in Algeria was over 40%, higher than that in France at the time. However, when the French left in 1962, the literacy rate in Algiers was at best 10-15%.

Linguistic discrimination in governance 

As colonial languages are used as the languages of governance and commerce in many colonial and postcolonial states, locals who only speak indigenous languages can be disenfranchised. For example, when representative institutions were introduced to the Algoma region in what is now modern-day Canada, the local returning officer only accepted the votes of individuals who were enfranchised, which required indigenous peoples to "read and write fluently... [their] own and another language, either English or French". This caused political parties to increasingly identify with settler perspectives rather than indigenous ones.

Even today, many postcolonial states continue to use colonial languages in their public institutions, even though these languages are not spoken by the majority of their residents. For example, the South African justice system still relies primarily on English and Afrikaans as its primary languages, even though most South Africans, particularly Black South Africans, speak indigenous languages. In these situations, the use of colonial languages can present barriers to participation in public institutions.

Examples

Linguistic discrimination is often defined in terms of prejudice of language. It is important to note that although there is a relationship between prejudice and discrimination, they are not always directly related.  Prejudice can be defined as negative attitudes towards a person based on their membership of a social group, whereas discrimination can be seen as the acts towards them. The difference between the two should be recognized because prejudice may be held against someone, but it may not be acted on. The following are examples of linguistic prejudice which may result in discrimination.

Linguistic prejudice and minority groups

While, theoretically, any speaker may be the victim of linguicism regardless of social and ethnic status, oppressed and marginalized social minorities are often the most consistent targets, due to the fact that the speech varieties that come to be associated with such groups have a tendency to be stigmatized.

In Canada

Francophones in Canada

Historically, the Canadian federation and provinces have discriminated against Canada's French-speaking population, during some periods in the history of Canada, they have treated its members as second-class citizens, and they have favored the members of the more powerful English-speaking population. This form of discrimination has resulted in or contributed to many developments in Canadian history, including the rise of the Quebec sovereignty movement, Quebecois nationalism, the Lower Canada Rebellion, the Red River Rebellion, a proposed Acadia province, extreme poverty and low socio-economic status of the French Canadian population, low francophone graduation rates as a result of the outlawing of francophone schools across Canada, differences in average earnings between francophones and anglophones in the same positions, fewer chances of being hired or promoted for francophones, and many other things.

Anglophones in Quebec

The Charter of the French Language, first established in 1977 and amended several times since, has been accused of being discriminatory by English-speakers. The law makes French the official language of Quebec and mandates its use (with exceptions) in government offices and communiques, schools, and in commercial public relations. The law is a way of preventing linguistic discrimination against the majority francophone population of Quebec who were for a very long time controlled by the English minority of the province. The law also seeks to protect French against the growing social and economic dominance of English. Though the English-speaking population had been shrinking since the 1960s, it was hastened by the law, and the 2006 census showed a net loss of 180,000 native English-speakers. Despite this, speaking English at work continues to be strongly correlated with higher earnings, with French-only speakers earning significantly less. The law is credited with successfully raising the status of French in a predominantly English-speaking economy, and it has been influential in countries facing similar circumstances. However, amendments have made it less powerful and thus less effective than it was in the past.

In Europe

Linguistic disenfranchisement rate 

The linguistic disenfranchisement rate in the EU can significantly vary across countries. For residents in two EU-countries that are either native speakers of English or proficient in English as a foreign language the disenfranchisement rate is equal to zero. In his study "Multilingual communication for whom? Language policy and fairness in the European Union", Michele Gazzola comes to the conclusion that the current multilingual policy of the EU is not in the absolute the most effective way to inform Europeans about the EU; in certain countries, additional languages may be useful to minimize linguistic exclusion.

In the 24 countries examined, an English-only language policy would exclude 51% to 90% of adult residents. A language regime based on English, French and German would disenfranchise 30% to 56% of residents, whereas a regime based on six languages would bring the shares of excluded population down to 9–22%.  After Brexit, the rates of linguistic exclusion associated with a monolingual policy and with a trilingual and a hexalingual regime are likely to increase.

Linguistic discrimination towards languages in the Celtic nations 

 During the period of British rule in Ireland, the Irish language was not taught in schools and held no official status until the establishment of the Irish Free State in 1922.

 In Wales, English was seen as the language of progress and the speaking of Welsh was discouraged in schools, and the Welsh Not was used in some places to help with this during the 18th and 19th centuries.

 Scottish Gaelic had no official status until 2005; it was not taught in the educational system due to being "one of the chief, principal causes of barbarity and incivility" in the words of one statute.

 Scots was in 1946 not considered "a suitable medium of education or culture".

Other examples 

Basque: public usage of Basque was persecuted and restricted during Francoist Spain, 1936 to 1978. Galician and Catalan have similar histories.

Vergonha is the term used for the effect of various policies of the government of France on its citizens whose mother tongue was one of so-called patois. In 1539, with Article 111 of the Ordinance of Villers-Cotterêts, French – the language of the Île-de-France – became the only official language in the country despite being spoken by only a minority of the population. In education and administration, it was forbidden to use regional languages, such as Occitan, Catalan, Basque and Breton. The French government still has not ratified the European Charter for Regional or Minority Languages. On 8 April 2021, the Breton MP Paul Molac tried to pass a law to protect minority languages, and this law was passed by the French Parliament in Paris. However, the French Minister of Education, opposed to the teaching in minority languages, asked the Conseil Constitutionnel to declare it unconstitutional. This led to the law being constitutionally struck down on 21 May 2021. This decision recognizes the right of central administration to oppose the spelling of Basque and Breton names when they contain an ñ letter and forbid such names.  

Dutch in Belgium after its independence in 1830. French was for a long time the only official language and the only language of education, administration, law and justice despite Dutch being the most common language, due to reject in dirigencial classes because the identification with the Netherlands rule between 1815 and 1830. This has led to widespread language shift in Brussels. Discrimination slowly faded over the decades and formally ended in the 1960s, when the Dutch version of the constitution became equal to the French version.

Germanisation: Prussian discrimination of West Slavs in the 19th century, such as the removal of Polish from secondary (1874) and primary (1886) schools, the use of corporal punishment leading to such events as the Września school strike.

Low Saxon (Low German) in Germany: While Middle Saxon served as a lingua franca in the North and Baltic Sea areas from around the 12th/13th century until the early 16th century, nobility, institutions of authority and influential people in the 16th century started to force writers in Northern Germany to use Early New High German as their written language. This caused a change first in the written language and later on in the spoken language through a strong social stigmatization by what this process has been called an inner colonization by linguist Peter von Polenz that was similar to the Germanisation of Slavic peoples. This was also the time when the name of the language changed from sassesch or sassesche sprâke (Saxon language) to Plattdütsch (lit. Flat German).

Magyarisation: For most of its existence, the Kingdom of Hungary had been a linguistically inclusionary state, but with the rise of ethnic nationalism in the early 19th century, this tradition was completely reversed due to a gradual adoption of nationalist and anti-minority policies by Hungary's ruling elites. The policy of Magyarisation (sometimes also "Hungarianisation") emerged in the 19th-century Kingdom of Hungary, and was practiced until the dissolution of Austria-Hungary in 1918. Magyarization saw efforts to marginalize and erase the use of minority languages in culture, education, politics, placenames and even everyday use. Targets included a number of Slavic languages (Slovak, Rusyn, Ukrainian, etc.), Romanian, and others. During the 1890s, hundreds of villages and towns throughout the Hungarian part of Austria-Hungary were forcibly renamed to more Hungarian forms. This included the renaming of already existing Hungarian placenames, previously in use for centuries, largely to promote the exclusionary nationalist ideology of the era. The strictest pro-Magyarization policies were adopted as legislation in 1907, known as the Apponyi Laws (Lex Apponyi), spearheaded by Albert Apponyi. The laws, as adopted, intentionally discriminated all minority languages, in an effort to completely exclude them from use in public life. 

Norwegianization: Former policy carried out by the Norwegian government directed at the Sámi and later the Kven people of the Sapmi region in Northern Norway.

Russification: 19th century policies on the territories seized due to Partitions of Poland, such as banning Polish, Lithuanian and Belarusian in public places (1864), later (1880s), Polish was banned in schools and offices of Congress Poland. Ukrainian and Romanian were also discriminated against. Under the Russian Empire, there were some attempts in 1899–1917 to make Russian the only official language of Finland. 

In the Soviet Union, following the phase of Korenizatsiya ("indigenization") and before Perestroika (late 1930s to late 1980s), Russian was called "the language of friendship of nations" to the disadvantage of other languages of the Soviet Union.

The russification and restraining of the linguistic rights of federal subjects in Russia, most notably in the federal subject of Tatarstan.

Controversy over 2009 amendment to Slovak language law: The 1995 Slovak language law defined Slovak as the official language of the Slovak Republic, with other related laws guaranteeing rights to the country's minority languages (e.g. in bureaucracy, education, cultural venues, multilingual street and road signs). The law was subsequently amended in 1999, to guarantee further protection to minority language use and comply with EU standards. The law saw controversial amendments in 2009. Slovakia's 2006-2010 government passed a controversial amendment to aspects of the language law in 2009. Hungarians in Slovakia and politicians in Hungary accused the law of being discriminatory to their language group, claiming it endangers the rights to use Hungarian in the country. The 2010-2012 Slovak government opened the law again in 2011, voting to remove the previous controversial amendments. 
 
 Serb organisations in Montenegro have reported discrimination of Serbian.
Spain: Language policies of Francoist Spain refers to the attempted elevation of Castilian over the other languages of Spain during the dictatorship of Francisco Franco from 1936 to 1975.

 Ukraine: Since 1804, all Ukrainian-language schools were banned in Ukraine under the Russian Empire. Ukrainian language was denied its right of existence by the Russian rulers based on Valuev Circular. Since 1892 the books were not allowed to be translated from Russian into Ukrainian.

In the United States

Perpetuation of discriminatory practices through terminology

Here and elsewhere the terms 'standard' and 'non-standard' make analysis of linguicism difficult. These terms are used widely by linguists and non-linguists when discussing varieties of American English that engender strong opinions, a false dichotomy which is rarely challenged or questioned. This has been interpreted by linguists Nicolas Coupland, Rosina Lippi-Green, and Robin Queen (among others) as a discipline-internal lack of consistency which undermines progress; if linguists themselves cannot move beyond the ideological underpinnings of 'right' and 'wrong' in language, there is little hope of advancing a more nuanced understanding in the general population.

Black Americans

Because some black Americans speak a particular non-standard variety of English which is often seen as substandard, they are often targets of linguicism. AAVE is often perceived by members of mainstream American society as indicative of low intelligence or limited education, and as with many other non-standard dialects and especially creoles, it is usually called "lazy" or "bad" English.

The linguist John McWhorter has described this particular form of linguicism as particularly problematic in the United States, where non-standard linguistic structures are often deemed "incorrect" by teachers and potential employers in contrast to other countries such as Morocco, Finland and Italy where diglossia (the ability to switch between two or more dialects or languages) is an accepted norm, and non-standard usage in conversation is seen as a mark of regional origin, not of intellectual capacity or achievement.

In the 1977 Ann Arbor court case, AAVE was compared against standard English to determine how much of an education barrier existed for children that had been primarily raised with AAVE. The assigned linguists determined that the differences, stemming from a history of racial segregation, were significant enough for the children to receive supplementary teaching to better understand standard English.

For example, a black American who uses a typical AAVE sentence such as "He be comin' in every day and sayin' he ain't done nothing" may be judged as having a deficient command of grammar, whereas, in fact, such a sentence is constructed based on a complex grammar which is different from that of standard English, not a degenerate form of it. A listener may misjudge the user of such a sentence to be unintellectual or uneducated. The speaker may be intellectually capable, educated, and proficient in standard English, but chose to say the sentence in AAVE for social and sociolinguistic reasons such as the intended audience of the sentence, a phenomenon known as code switching.

Hispanic Americans and linguicism

Another form of linguicism is evidenced by the following: in some parts of the United States, a person who has a strong Spanish accent and uses only simple English words may be thought of as poor, poorly educated, and possibly an undocumented immigrant. However, if the same person has a diluted accent or no noticeable accent at all and can use a myriad of words in complex sentences, they are likely to be perceived as more successful, better educated, and a "legitimate citizen". Accent has two parts, the speaker and the listener. Thus, some people may perceive an accent as strong because they are not used to hearing them and the emphasis is on an unexpected syllable or as soft and imperceptible. The bias and discrimination that ensues is tied to the difficulty the listener has in understanding that accent. The fact that the person uses a very broad vocabulary creates even more cognitive dissonance on the part of the listener who will immediately think of the speaker as either undocumented, poor, uneducated or even insulting to their intelligence.

American Sign Language users

Users of American Sign Language (ASL) have faced linguistic discrimination based on the perception of the legitimacy of signed languages compared to spoken languages. This attitude was explicitly expressed in the Milan Conference of 1880 which set precedence for public opinion of manual forms of communication, including ASL, creating lasting consequences for members of the Deaf community.  The conference almost unanimously (save a handful of allies such as Thomas Hopkins Gallaudet), reaffirmed the use of oralism, instruction conducted exclusively in spoken language, as the preferred education method for Deaf individuals.  These ideas were outlined in eight resolutions which ultimately resulted in the removal of Deaf individuals from their own educational institutions, leaving generations of Deaf persons to be educated single-handedly by hearing individuals.

Due to misconceptions about ASL, it was not recognized as its own, fully functioning language until recently. In the 1960s, linguist William Stokoe proved ASL to be its own language based on its unique structure and grammar, separate from that of English. Before this, ASL was thought to be merely a collection of gestures used to represent English. Because of its use of visual space, it was mistakenly believed that its users are of a lesser mental capacity. The misconception that ASL users are incapable of complex thought was prevalent, although this has decreased as further studies about its recognition of a language have taken place. For example, ASL users faced overwhelming discrimination for the supposedly "lesser" language that they use and were met with condescension especially when using their language in public. Another way discrimination against ASL is evident is how, despite research conducted by linguists like Stokoe or Clayton Valli and Cecil Lucas of Gallaudet University, ASL is not always recognized as a language. Its recognition is crucial both for those learning ASL as an additional language, and for prelingually-deaf children who learn ASL as their first language. Linguist Sherman Wilcox concludes that given that it has a body of literature and international scope, to single ASL out as unsuitable for a foreign language curriculum is inaccurate. Russel S. Rosen also writes about government and academic resistance to acknowledging ASL as a foreign language at the high school or college level, which Rosen believes often resulted from a lack of understanding about the language. Rosen and Wilcox's conclusions both point to discrimination ASL users face regarding its status as a language, that although decreasing over time is still present.

In the medical community, there is immense bias against deafness and ASL. This stems from the belief that spoken languages are superior to sign languages. Because 90% of deaf babies are born to hearing parents, who are usually unaware of the existence of the Deaf community, they often turn to the medical community for guidance. Medical and audiological professionals, who are typically biased against sign languages, encourage parents to get a cochlear implant for their deaf child in order for the child to use spoken language. Research shows, however, that deaf kids without cochlear implants acquire ASL with much greater ease than deaf kids with cochlear implants acquire spoken English. In addition, medical professionals discourage parents from teaching ASL to their deaf kid to avoid compromising their English although research shows that learning ASL does not interfere with a child's ability to learn English. In fact, the early acquisition of ASL proves to be useful to the child in learning English later on. When making a decision about cochlear implantation, parents are not properly educated about the benefits of ASL or the Deaf Community. This is seen by many members of the Deaf Community as cultural and linguistic genocide.

In Africa 

 Anglophone Cameroonians: the central Cameroonian government has pushed francophonization in the English-speaking regions of the country despite constitutional stipulations on bilingualism. Measures include appointing French-speaking teachers and judges (in regions with Common Law) despite local opposition. However, Anglophones in Cameroon are not all those who have English as their first official language, as opposed to those who speak French as their first official language. As stated by Professor Simo Bobda (2001), Anglophony in Cameroon is more an ethnic, cultural and regional concept than a linguistic one. This definition excludes Francophones who have been settled for a long time in the English-speaking area, even if they have property and ties there. This analysis also excludes Francophones who master English because they have acquired an Anglo-Saxon education, or studied in establishments of the Anglophone subsystem which proliferate in the Francophone zone. Clearly, the Anglophones of Cameroon are indeed a very particular cultural identity, a limited geographical space and a specific historical course, before being a simple linguistic community. With this preliminary clarification, we can better understand the nature and contours of the English-speaking problem which today is raising socio-political tension in the South-West and North-West regions of the country.
https://fr.wikipedia.org/wiki/Probl%C3%A8me_anglophone_au_Cameroun

 South Africa: Carolyn McKinley is highly critical of the language policy in the South African educational system, which she describes as 'anglonormatif', because the increasing anglicisation becomes 'normative' in the education system. The universities of Pretoria, Free State and Unisa want to anglicise completely.

In the Middle East 

 At the turn of the eighth century, the Umayyad caliph Abd al-Malik ibn Marwan decreed that Arabic would replace Medieval Greek and the Coptic language as the administrative language of the empire. Coptic gradually declined within a few hundred years and suffered violent persecutions, especially under the Mamluke Sultanate of Cairo, leading to its virtual extinction by the 17th century.

 The Kurdish languages are under pressure in many countries where they are spoken. Publishing materials in Kurdish in Syria is forbidden, though this prohibition is not enforced any more due to the Syrian civil war. Until 2002, Turkey placed severe restrictions on the use of Kurdish, including a ban on its use in education and broadcast media. Many mayors were tried for issuing public documents in the Kurdish language. The Kurdish alphabet is not recognized in Turkey, and prior to 2013 the use of Kurdish names containing the letters Q, W, and X, which do not exist in the Turkish alphabet, was not allowed. Turkey began to allow private television channels to broadcast in Kurdish on a limited basis in 2006, with most restrictions lifted by 2009. The state-run Turkish Radio and Television Corporation (TRT) started its 24-hour Kurdish television station in 2009, with full use of the letters Q, W, and X. In 2010, Kurdish municipalities in the southeast began printing marriage certificates, water bills, construction and road signs, as well as emergency, social and cultural notices in Kurdish alongside Turkish. Also, Imams began to deliver Friday sermons in Kurdish and Esnaf price tags in Kurdish.  In 2012, Kurdish-language lessons became an elective subject in public schools. Previously, Kurdish education had only been possible in private institutions.

In Asia 

 Suppression of Korean during Japanese rule in Korea, 1910 to 1945.

Anti-Chinese legislation in Indonesia

 The brutality and linguicism against Tamils in Sri Lanka which took thousands of Tamil lives because of their language. This was rooted from "The Sinhala Only Act", formerly the Official Language Act No. 33 of 1956, that was passed in the Parliament of Ceylon in 1956. Black July was the peak of the violence against Tamils in 1983.

China: In the 2000s the Chinese government began promoting the use of Mandarin Chinese in areas where Cantonese is spoken. In 2010 this gave rise to the Guangzhou Television Cantonese controversy. This has also been a point of contention with Hong Kong, which is located in the general area where Cantonese is spoken. Cantonese has become a means of asserting Hong Kong's political identity as separate from mainland China.

After the Kuomintang retreated to Taiwan following the Chinese Civil War, the Nationalist government promoted Mandarin and banned the public use of Taiwanese and other native languages as part of a deliberate political repression, especially in schools and broadcast media. In 1964 use of Taiwanese in schools or official settings was forbidden, and transgression in schools punished with beatings, fines and humiliation. This discrimination started to decrease and ended when martial law ended in 1987.

Bengali language movement occurred in a move to recognise Bengali as an official language in the then-Dominion of Pakistan of 1947.

Kannada supremacism widely known as "activism" is common in Karnataka and enjoys political support. It forces all residents including those from outside Karnataka to speak Kannada.

Marathi superamacy in Maharashtra (mainly Mumbai) perpuated by ultranationalist regional nativist parties like Shiv Sena and MNS which labelled immigrants as 'job stealers' and 'outsiders', with South Indian Kannadigas and Tuluvas becoming the target of Bal Thackeray's racist slurs and attack by Marathi goons who prided on their 'Marathi Manoos'  status. Subsequently Bihari, Gujarati  and other North Indian communities were targeted and attacked resulting in an exodus in 2008. Till date, there have been sporadic attacks and discrimination towards non-Marathi communities in Mumbai.

Imposition of Hindi by the Indian Government on non-Hindi speaking states, especially that of South India has led to anti Hindi agitations in states like Karnataka and Tamil Nadu. The prioritization of Hindi in non-Hindi speaking states has led to discrimination towards people who do not know Hindi.

Texts

Linguicism applies to written, spoken, or signed languages.  The quality of a book or article may be judged by the language in which it is written.  In the scientific community, for example, those who evaluated a text in two language versions, English and the national Scandinavian language, rated the English-language version as being of higher scientific content.

The Internet operates a great deal using written language.  Readers of a web page, Usenet group, forum post, or chat session may be more inclined to take the author seriously if the language is written in accordance with the standard language.

Prejudice

In contrast to the previous examples of linguistic prejudice, linguistic discrimination involves the actual treatment of individuals based on use of language. Examples may be clearly seen in the workplace, in marketing, and in education systems. For example, some workplaces enforce an English-only policy, which is part of an American political movement that pushes for English to be accepted as the official language. In the United States, the federal law, Titles VI and VII of the Civil Rights Act of 1964 protects non-native speakers from discrimination in the workplace based on their national origin or use of dialect. There are state laws which also address the protection of non-native speakers, such as the California Fair Employment and Housing Act. However, industries often argue in retrospect that clear, understandable English is often needed in specific work settings in the U.S.

See also 

 Anationalism
 Cultural assimilation
 Cultural genocide
 Economics of language
 Humanitism
 Indigenous language
 Linguistic insecurity
 Language death
 Language ideology
 Language policy
 Linguistic imperialism
 Linguistic prescriptivism
 Linguistic profiling
 Linguistic racism
 Minoritized language
 Minority language
 Monolingualism
 Nonstandard dialect
 Official language
 Prestige (sociolinguistics)
 Raciolinguistics
 Schizoglossia
 Standard language ideology

Notes

References

Literature
Skutnabb-Kangas et al. (eds.), Linguistic human rights: overcoming linguistic discrimination, Walter de Gruyter (1995), .
R. Wodak and D. Corson (eds.), Language policy and political issues in education, Springer, .

External links

Action Linguistic Rights: Violations of Linguistic Rights

 
Discrimination by type
Sociolinguistics